Nan Hu is a Chinese physician-scientist, molecular geneticist, and cancer epidemiologist who researches gastrointestinal cancers. She is a staff scientist in the metabolic epidemiology branch at the National Cancer Institute.

Life 
Hu received a medical degree from the Shanxi Medical College in 1976, followed by a master’s degree in cytogenetics and medical genetics from the Beijing Medical College in 1982. After completing a doctorate in cancer genetics from the Peking Union Medical College in 1987 under the mentorship of Wu Min, she served as a postdoctoral fellow with Janet Rowley at the University of Chicago from 1987 to 1989. Hu went on to work at the National Cancer Institute (NCI)—first as a visiting associate from 1990 to 1991, and then as a postdoctoral fellow with Dean Hamer from 1992 to 1994.  Under Hamer, she researched genetic theories of homosexuality. She joined the NCI cancer prevention fellowship program in 1994, earning an M.P.H. in epidemiology and biostatistics from the George Washington University in the process. 

Hu joined the NCI division of cancer epidemiology and cancer genetics (DCEG) as a staff scientist in 1998. She works in its metabolic epidemiology branch (MEB). Hu conducts molecular genetics bench work, epidemiologic field studies, and statistical analysis to research the etiology, prevention, and early detection of upper gastrointestinal cancers.

References 

Living people
Year of birth missing (living people)
Place of birth missing (living people)
Shanxi Medical University alumni
Peking Union Medical College alumni
Milken Institute School of Public Health alumni
National Institutes of Health people
20th-century Chinese women scientists
21st-century Chinese women scientists
20th-century women physicians
21st-century women physicians
Chinese medical researchers
Chinese epidemiologists
Women epidemiologists
Cancer epidemiologists
Chinese geneticists
Molecular geneticists
Women geneticists
Women molecular biologists
20th-century biologists
21st-century biologists
Chinese emigrants to the United States
Expatriate academics in the United States
Physician-scientists